Alfred Eneberg (30 November 1928 – 7 November 2016) was an Australian cricketer. He played one first-class match for South Australia in 1951/52.

See also
 List of South Australian representative cricketers

References

External links
 

1928 births
2016 deaths
Australian cricketers
South Australia cricketers
Cricketers from Adelaide